Famous in Love is an American drama television series that premiered on Freeform on April 18, 2017, and is based on the novel of the same name by Rebecca Serle. The series stars Bella Thorne, Charlie DePew, Georgie Flores, Carter Jenkins, Niki Koss, Keith Powers, Pepi Sonuga, and Perrey Reeves. On June 29, 2018, Freeform announced that it had cancelled the series after two seasons.

Plot 
Paige Townsen, an ordinary college student, gets her big break after auditioning for the starring role in a Hollywood blockbuster and must now navigate her new star-studded life and undeniable chemistry with her co-lead and her best friend.

Cast and characters

Main 
 Bella Thorne as Paige Townsen, a young and beautiful college student who gets cast in the movie adaptation of a blockbuster book series called Locked, which causes her life to change overnight. She is in a love triangle with her longtime crush, Jake (Charlie DePew) and Rainer (Carter Jenkins), her co-star in Locked.
 Charlie DePew as Jake Salt, a down-to-earth guy from the Midwest with an edge who aspires to be a screenwriter and an indie filmmaker. He is Paige's best friend and one of her love interests. Charlie DePew replaced Jesse Henderson in the role from the original pilot.
 Georgie Flores as Cassandra "Cassie" Perkins, Paige's roommate and best friend. Later, she becomes the girlfriend of Adam. 
 Carter Jenkins as Rainer Devon, the son of famous producer Nina Devon, and, as later revealed, Alan Mills. He is labeled the "sexiest man alive", and is a famous actor. He has a complicated friendship with Jordan Wilder and soon develops a romantic interest in Paige Townsen.
 Niki Koss as Alexis Glenn, Rainer's old friend who competes for the same role as Paige. She is secretly bisexual.
 Keith Powers as Jordan Wilder, a troubled star who lands the role of the other point in the movie's famous love triangle. He and Rainer are best friends but have a complicated history which is further heightened by the fact that both share a past with Tangey.
 Pepi Sonuga as Tangey Turner, a pop star with a controlling mother. She was sleeping with Jordan Wilder while dating Rainer Devon, which creates tension between the two men.
 Perrey Reeves as Nina Devon, Rainer's smart and cunning mother. Confident and manipulative, she will do whatever it takes to make sure things go her way.

Recurring 
 Jason Antoon as Wyatt, the original director of the movie adaptation of Locked, who leaves the production on the film during its two-month hiatus (season 1)
 Katelyn Tarver as Rachael Davis, former Broadway actress and Alexis's love interest (season 1)
 Nathan Stewart-Jarrett as Barrett, an entertainment and gossip reporter whose beat is Hollywood (season 1)
 Tanjareen Martin as Brandy (season 1)
 Shawn Christian as Alan Mills, the head of the film studio producing the movie who is later revealed to be Rainer's biological father 
 Vanessa Williams as Ida, Tangey's mother and manager
 Tom Maden as Adam, a production assistant on the movie and Cassie's boyfriend
 Danielle Campbell as Harper, a former child star whom Rainer meets in rehab and with whom he quickly becomes involved (season 2)
 Claudia Lee as Billy, an actress working as a waitress whom Jake hires to replace Paige as the lead on his independent film (season 2)
Sofia Carson as Sloane, the best friend of Alexis (season 2)

Production

Development 
Freeform, then known as ABC Family, had picked up the pilot for fast-track development on March 19, 2015. The pilot was shot in November 2015; Freeform greenlit the pilot on April 7, 2016, and shooting began on July 13, 2016, and wrapped up on October 19, 2016. On November 18, 2016, Freeform announced that the series would premiere on April 18, 2017. Freeform also released the entire season for viewing online on April 18, 2017. The series is based on the novel of the same name, written by Rebecca Serle. Serle worked with I. Marlene King to develop the novel into a television series. Freeform renewed the series for a second season on August 3, 2017. The table read for the second season started on October 30, 2017. The second season premiered on Freeform on April 4, 2018.

On June 26, 2018, it was reported that Freeform had decided to cancel the series after Hulu declined to contribute more money towards the production of a third season. Clashes between actress Bella Thorne and showrunner I. Marlene King were also cited as part of the reason for the cancellation; however, these statements were dismissed by King on her Twitter account. On June 29, Freeform officially cancelled the series.

Casting 
Romeo Miller was cast as Pablo $$ in a recurring role for the second season. Sofia Carson appeared in multiple episodes of the second season as Sloane, the daughter of a movie mogul.

Episodes

Series overview

Season 1 (2017) 
The entire first season was released on digital platforms, such as OnDemand, the Freeform App and website, and Hulu, on April 18, 2017.

Season 2 (2018)

Broadcast 
The second season returned with a two-hour premiere on Freeform on April 4, 2018. It aired in Canada on E! on April 8, 2018, with new episodes set to air every Sunday.

In the United Kingdom, it airs exclusively on Amazon Prime Video with new episodes every Thursday.

In Spain, it airs exclusively on HBO Spain with new episodes every Thursday.

Ratings 
 

| link2             = #Season 2
| episodes2         = 10
| start2            = 
| end2              = 
| startrating2         = 0.29
| endrating2           = 0.22
| viewers2          = 0.25
}}

Season 1 (2017)

Season 2 (2018)

Nominations

References

External links 
 

2010s American LGBT-related drama television series
2010s American drama television series
2010s American romance television series
2017 American television series debuts
2018 American television series endings
American romantic drama television series
English-language television shows
Freeform (TV channel) original programming
Lesbian-related television shows
Serial drama television series
Television shows based on American novels
Television series about actors
Television series about filmmaking
Television series about show business
Television series by Warner Horizon Television
Television shows filmed in Los Angeles
Television shows set in Los Angeles